Nikopoli, known before 1927 as Zarovo (Ζάροβο), is a village and a community of the Lagkadas municipality. Before the 2011 local government reform it was part of the municipality of Lachanas, of which it was a municipal district. The 2011 census recorded 134 inhabitants in the village. The community of Nikopoli covers an area of 20.349 km2.

See also
 List of settlements in the Thessaloniki regional unit

References

Populated places in Thessaloniki (regional unit)